Sawmill Point is a 9,429-foot-elevation (2,874 meter) mountain summit located in Inyo County, California. It is situated 2.6 miles east of the crest of the Sierra Nevada mountain range, in the John Muir Wilderness, on land managed by Inyo National Forest. The Sawmill Pass Trail traverses the east and south slopes of the peak, providing an approach option, and access to the John Muir Trail.

History
The landform's toponym has been officially adopted by the United States Board on Geographic Names. The peak is named in association with Sawmill Creek, which in turn was named for the sawmill that James W. Smith operated along the creek in the 1870s. The first recorded ascent of the summit was made by Art J. Reyman and Fred L. Jones on January 11, 1953, by ascending the northeast ridge. The party was not the first on the summit however, because they found cairns, but no record.

Climate
According to the Köppen climate classification system, Sawmill Point is located in an alpine climate zone. Most weather fronts originate in the Pacific Ocean, and travel east toward the Sierra Nevada mountains. As fronts approach, they are forced upward by the peaks (orographic lift), causing them to drop their moisture in the form of rain or snowfall onto the range. Precipitation runoff from this mountain drains into Division and Sawmill creeks, thence Owens Valley.

See also
 
 List of mountain peaks of California

Gallery

References

External links
 Sawmill Point weather forecast

Inyo National Forest
Mountains of Inyo County, California
Mountains of the John Muir Wilderness
North American 2000 m summits
Mountains of Northern California
Mountains of the Sierra Nevada (United States)